Ramgarh is a town in Nohar tehsil in Hanumangarh district of Rajasthan state. Old name of Ramgarh is Chindaliya and other name is Shri Ramgarh.
It is subtehsil also.
Sarpanch of Ramgarh is Mr. Ajab Kumar Bhambhu.

References 

Villages in Hanumangarh district